Citripestis sagittiferella, the citrus fruit borer, is a species of snout moth in the genus Citripestis. It was described by Frederic Moore in 1891. It is found in Indonesia, Malaysia, Singapore and Thailand.

Adults are grey brown with yellow to grey-brown forewings and translucent hindwings.

The larvae feed on Citrus species and are considered a pest. They penetrate the fruit of their host plant, causing rotting and premature dropping of the infested fruit. The larvae are orange to dark reddish brown with dark brown head.

References

Moths described in 1891
Phycitinae
Moths of Japan